The Forgotten Holocaust is a 1986 book by Richard C. Lukas about the occupation of Poland during World War II.

Forgotten holocaust may also refer to:

 The Rape of Nanking: The Forgotten Holocaust of World War II, a 1997 book by Iris Chang about the 1937–1938 Nanking Massacre

See also
 The Holocaust, World War II genocide of European Jews
 Armenian Holocaust, 1914–1923 murder and expulsion of Armenians by the Ottoman government in Turkey
 Romani Holocaust, World War II ethnic cleansing and genocide against Europe's Romani people
 Ukrainian Holocaust (Holodomor), 1932–33 famine in Soviet Ukraine